These are 11 National Natural Landmarks in Idaho. 

Idaho
National Natural Landmarks